Park Woo-Chul (Korean:박우철, born 4 April 1973) is a South Korean ice sledge hockey player. He played in the 2010 and 2014 Paralympic Winter Games. He won a silver medal at the 2012 IPC Ice Sledge Hockey World Championships.

References

External links 
 

1973 births
Living people
South Korean sledge hockey players
Paralympic sledge hockey players of South Korea
Ice sledge hockey players at the 2010 Winter Paralympics
Ice sledge hockey players at the 2014 Winter Paralympics